Martina Basile (born 10 October 2002)  is an Italian retired artistic gymnast. She won the bronze medal in the junior all-around competition and the silver medal on vault at the 2016  European Championship.

References

 2002 births
Living people
Italian female artistic gymnasts
Mediterranean Games gold medalists for Italy
Mediterranean Games medalists in gymnastics
Competitors at the 2018 Mediterranean Games
21st-century Italian women